Chionodes metallica is a moth in the family Gelechiidae. It is found in North America, where it has been recorded from southern Alberta, Montana and Wyoming.

The wingspan is 9.5-11.5 mm. The forewings are lustrous dark bronzy brown. The hindwings are shining pale fuscous, with slightly yellowish elongate scales on the disc.

References

Chionodes
Moths described in 1921
Moths of North America